Argos was a small town of ancient Greece in the southwest of the island of Nisyros.

Its site is located near modern Stavros.

References

Populated places in the ancient Aegean islands
Former populated places in Greece